
Weise is a surname, meaning "wise" or "prudent" in German. 

Notable people with the name include:

A 
Andreas Weise (born 1986), Swedish singer and songwriter
Agustín Saavedra Weise (born 1943), Bolivian diplomat and writer
Arne Weise (1930–2019), Swedish television personality

B 
Birgit Weise, German luger
Brian Weise, American soccer coach

C 
Christian Weise (1642–1708), German writer and dramatist

D 
Dale Weise (born 1988), Canadian ice hockey player
David Weise, ballroom dancer
Dietrich Weise (1934–2020), German footballer and football manager
Dirk Weise (born 1952), German sprint canoer

E 
Eberhard Weise (born 1953), German bobsledder

H 
Hans-Joachim Weise (born 1912), German competitive sailor
Hubert Weise (1884–1950), German Luftwaffe officer

J 
Jeff Weise (1988–2005), American spree killer and school shooter who perpetrated the 2005 Red Lake shootings
Julia Vargas-Weise (1942 – 1 April 2018) Bolivian photographer, screenwriter, educator, and film director
Julius Weise (1844–1925), German entomologist

K 
Konrad Weise (born 1951), German football player

M 
Małgorzata Wiese-Jóźwiak (born 1961), Polish chess player
Markus Weise (born 1962), German field hockey coach
Martin Weise (1903-1943), German journalist and resistance fighter

W 
Wolfgang Weise (born 1949), German volleyball player

Woeser (born 1966), also written Wéisè, Tibetan activist, blogger, poet and essayist

See also
Weis (disambiguation)
Weiser (disambiguation)
Weiss (disambiguation)
Weisse
Weisz